Maaseik was a constituency used to elect a single member of the Belgian Chamber of Representatives between 1839 and 1900. It replaced Roermond as a constituency for the province of Limburg when that city passed to the Kingdom of the Netherlands as a result of the Treaty of London. The first member from Maaseik had been elected from Roermond in 1837.

Representatives

References

Defunct constituencies of the Chamber of Representatives (Belgium)